Mangelia compsacosta is an extinct species of sea snail, a marine gastropod mollusk in the family Mangeliidae.

Description
The length of the shell attains 5.8 mm, its diameter 2 mm.

Distribution
This extinct marine species was found in the Alum Bluff Group, Florida, USA

References

External links

compsacosta
Gastropods described in 1947